Petras Būtėnas (27 June 1896 – 4 October 1980) was a Lithuanian linguist and public figure. His work was very important in the research of Lithuanian culture.

Early life 
He had a younger brother .

Interwar 
From 1919 to 1923, he was a volunteer soldier of the Lithuanian Army. In 1930, Būtėnas graduated from Vytautas Magnus University. He was a student of Kazimieras Būga, Jonas Jablonskis and Juozas Balčikonis. From 1925 to 1944, Būtėnas worked as a teacher in Panevėžys. He taught in the town's teachers' seminary until 1936. Since 1939, he was a member of the Lithuanian Catholic Academy of Science.

World War II 
The Soviet authorities imprisoned Būtėnas from July 1940 to January 1941 in the Panevėžys Prison. Together with others, he published the weekly Išlaisvintasis panevėžietis ('The liberated Panevėžian') in 1941.

During 1941–1944, he was the director of Panevėžys Boys' Gymnasium. He left for Germany in 1944.

In emigration 
He organized courses for Lithuanian teachers and lead those courses in 1945–1948. In 1946, he prepared a summary for the Lithuanian language teachers' courses and gymnasium. From 1945 to 1948, he edited the newspaper Lietuvių informacija ('Lithuanian information'), and in 1946–1948, the magazine Žingsniai ('Steps'). Būtėnas moved to the US in 1949. He worked in the newspaper Keleivis ('Passenger') and in the editorial office of the Lithuanian Encyclopedia.

Academic work 
Būtėnas researched Lithuanian , accentuation and ancient ethnically Lithuanian territories. He contributed to the preparation of the Lietuvių kalbos žodyno ('Dictionary of the Lithuanian Language'), in which he wrote down more than 8,000 words. He collected folklore and prepared Lietuvių tautotyros žinių ir senienų rinkimo programą ("Lithuanian Ethnography Knowledge and Antiquities Collection Program") in 1925. Būtėnas collected material for the research of old Lithuanian toponymy.

Bibliography

Books 
 Kirčio ir priegaidės žinios (1926)
 Trumpas linksnių mokslas praktiškam lietuvių kalbos reikalui (1929)
 Lietuvių kalbos prielinksnių mokslas teorijai ir praktikai (1930)
 Priežodžio ir patarlės gyvenimas (1930)
 Lietuvių kalbos akcentologijos vadovėlis mokyklai ir gyvenimui (1931)
 Augštaičių tarmės akuojančios pašneklės sienos (1932)

Articles 
1956

1957

1962

1963

1964

1965

1966

1967

1968

1970

1971

Awards 

 1935 – 4th Class of the Order of the Lithuanian Grand Duke Gediminas.

References

Sources 

 
 

Balticists
1896 births
1980 deaths
Linguists from Lithuania
Historical linguists
Lithuanian editors
Lithuanian lexicographers
Linguists of Lithuanian
Lithuanian emigrants to the United States